Uychi is a district of Namangan Region in Uzbekistan. The capital lies at the town Uychi. Its area is 304 km2. Its population is 216,800 (2021 est.).

The district consists of 13 urban-type settlements (Uychi, Oʻnhayot, Birlashgan, Fayziobod, Churtuk, Axsi, Jiydakapa, Kichik toshloq, Mashad, Soku, Boyogʻon, Gʻayrat, Ziyokor) and 8 rural communities.

References 

Districts of Uzbekistan
Namangan Region